Panskura Junction is a railway junction station on the Howrah–Kharagpur line and is located in Purba Medinipur district in the Indian state of West Bengal. It serves Panskura.

History
thumb|left|Panskura Junction railway station
The Howrah–Kharagpur line was opened in 1900.

The Panskura–Durgachak line was opened in 1968, at a time when Haldia Port was being constructed. It was subsequently extended to Haldia.

Electrification
The Howrah–Kharagpur line was electrified in 1967–69. The Panskura–Haldia line was electrified in 1974–76.

Car shed
There is a car shed of South Eastern Railway at Panskura.

Railway Park
Panskura Junction railway station has a beautiful park for children in the station area.

Facilities

The major facilities available are First class and Second class waiting rooms, running room, computerised reservation facility, reservation counter, vehicle parking etc. There are  tea stall, R.M.S. and Government Railway police (GRP) office. Automatic ticket vending machines are installed to reduce the queue for train tickets on the station

Platforms
There are six platforms in Panskura Junction railway station. The platforms are interconnected with a foot overbridge(FOB).
The ruins of the historic cities of Tamluk and Raghunathbari are approachable from Panskura Junction railway station.

References

External links
 Trains at Panskura

Railway stations in Purba Medinipur district
Railway junction stations in West Bengal
Kharagpur railway division
Kolkata Suburban Railway stations